The 1983–84 Greek Football Cup was the 42nd edition of the Greek Football Cup.

Tournament details

Totally 76 teams participated, 16 from Alpha Ethniki, 20 from Beta, and 40 from Gamma. It was held in 7 rounds, included final. An Additional Round was held between First and Second, with 6 matches, in order that the teams would continue to be 32. Concerning the previous years, there are single matches only in the First Round.

Third Round was the most interesting phase of competition. Winners of previous season, AEK Athens, was eliminated by AEL. Iraklis qualified for second possessed year against Aris. Also, Ethnikos Piraeus qualified after 44 years against Olympiacos in Piraeus rivalry, with two draws (0-0 and 1-1). It's remarkable that, while both matches had become in Georgios Karaiskakis Stadium, the common home of two clubs, Ethnikos was formally away team in the second leg, so they qualified with away goals rule. AEL's win against Achaiki in the Second Round was impressive (10-0, 5 goals by Michalis Ziogas).

The Final contested by Panathinaikos and Larissa, such as 2 years before. The match was held at Athens Olympic Stadium. Panathinaikos won 2–0, achieving The Double for that season. The match was the last one for Panathinaikos' captain, Anthimos Kapsis. There were 73,829 spectators, a record attendance for a Greek Cup Final.

Calendar

Knockout phase
Each tie in the knockout phase, apart from the first two rounds and the final, was played over two legs, with each team playing one leg at home. The team that scored more goals on aggregate over the two legs advanced to the next round. If the aggregate score was level, the away goals rule was applied, i.e. the team that scored more goals away from home over the two legs advanced. If away goals were also equal, then extra time was played. The away goals rule was again applied after extra time, i.e. if there were goals scored during extra time and the aggregate score was still level, the visiting team advanced by virtue of more away goals scored. If no goals were scored during extra time, the winners were decided by a penalty shoot-out. In the first two rounds and the final, which were played as a single match, if the score was level at the end of normal time, extra time was played, followed by a penalty shoot-out if the score was still level.The mechanism of the draws for each round is as follows:
There are no seedings, and teams from the same group can be drawn against each other.

First round

|}

Additional round

|}

Bracket

Round of 32

|}

Round of 16

|}

Quarter-finals

|}

Semi-finals

|}

Final

The 40th Greek Cup Final was played at the Olympic Stadium.

References

External links
Greek Cup 1983-84 at RSSSF

Greek Football Cup seasons
Greek Cup
Cup